The next Catalan regional election will be held no later than Monday, 31 March 2025, to elect the 14th Parliament of the autonomous community of Catalonia. All 135 seats in the Parliament will be up for election.

Overview

Electoral system
The Parliament of Catalonia is the devolved, unicameral legislature of the autonomous community of Catalonia, having legislative power in regional matters as defined by the Spanish Constitution and the Catalan Statute of Autonomy, as well as the ability to vote confidence in or withdraw it from a regional president.

As a result of no regional electoral law having been approved since the re-establishment of Catalan autonomy, the electoral procedure comes regulated under Transitory Provision Fourth of the 1979 Statute, supplemented by the provisions within the Organic Law of General Electoral Regime. Voting for the Parliament is on the basis of universal suffrage, which comprises all nationals over 18 years of age, registered in Catalonia and in full enjoyment of their political rights. Additionally, Catalans abroad are required to apply for voting before being permitted to vote, a system known as "begged" or expat vote. The 135 members of the Parliament of Catalonia are elected using the D'Hondt method and a closed list proportional representation, with a threshold of three percent of valid votes—which includes blank ballots—being applied in each constituency. Parties not reaching the threshold are not taken into consideration for seat distribution. Seats are allocated to constituencies, corresponding to the provinces of Barcelona, Girona, Lleida and Tarragona, with each being allocated a fixed number of seats: 85 for Barcelona, 17 for Girona, 15 for Lleida and 18 for Tarragona.

The use of the D'Hondt method may result in a higher effective threshold, depending on the district magnitude.

Election date
The term of the Parliament of Catalonia expires four years after the date of its previous election, unless it is dissolved earlier. The regional president is required to call an election fifteen days prior to the date of expiry of parliament, with election day taking place within from forty to sixty days after the call. The previous election was held on 14 February 2021, which means that the legislature's term will expire on 14 February 2025. The election is required to be called no later than 30 January 2025, with it taking place up to the sixtieth day from the call, setting the latest possible election date for the Parliament on Monday, 31 March 2025.

The president has the prerogative to dissolve the Parliament of Catalonia and call a snap election, provided that no motion of no confidence is in process and that dissolution does not occur before one year has elapsed since a previous one under this procedure. In the event of an investiture process failing to elect a regional president within a two-month period from the first ballot, the Parliament is to be automatically dissolved and a fresh election called.

Parliamentary composition
The table below shows the composition of the parliamentary groups in the chamber at the present time.

Parties and candidates
The electoral law allows for parties and federations registered in the interior ministry, coalitions and groupings of electors to present lists of candidates. Parties and federations intending to form a coalition ahead of an election are required to inform the relevant Electoral Commission within ten days of the election call, whereas groupings of electors need to secure the signature of at least one percent of the electorate in the constituencies for which they seek election, disallowing electors from signing for more than one list of candidates.

Below is a list of the main parties and electoral alliances which will likely contest the election:

Opinion polls
The tables below list opinion polling results in reverse chronological order, showing the most recent first and using the dates when the survey fieldwork was done, as opposed to the date of publication. Where the fieldwork dates are unknown, the date of publication is given instead. The highest percentage figure in each polling survey is displayed with its background shaded in the leading party's colour. If a tie ensues, this is applied to the figures with the highest percentages. The "Lead" column on the right shows the percentage-point difference between the parties with the highest percentages in a poll.

Graphical summary

Voting intention estimates
The table below lists weighted voting intention estimates. Refusals are generally excluded from the party vote percentages, while question wording and the treatment of "don't know" responses and those not intending to vote may vary between polling organisations. When available, seat projections determined by the polling organisations are displayed below (or in place of) the percentages in a smaller font; 68 seats are required for an absolute majority in the Parliament of Catalonia.

Voting preferences
The table below lists raw, unweighted voting preferences.

Preferred President
The table below lists opinion polling on leader preferences to become president of the Government of Catalonia.

Notes

References
Opinion poll sources

Other

Catalonia
2020s